Bill McGlone (born April 24, 1984) is a professional lacrosse player from Ridley, Pennsylvania. McGlone plays for the Boston Cannons of Major League Lacrosse and the Philadelphia Wings of the National Lacrosse League.

Collegiate career
McGlone was a three-time All-American for the University of Maryland Terps, and twice named to the All-ACC team. In 2006, he was the only repeat first team USILA All-American selection from the 2005 team. He was also the first team captain selected as a junior in 30 years and retained the position his senior in 2006.

He attended Ridley High School outside of Philadelphia, where he was an 2 time All-American in lacrosse,  All-state Receiver/Cornerback in football and an All-Delco point guard for the basketball team. McGlone teamed with Brett Moyer to win two straight Pennsylvania high school lacrosse title, and where he was an All State football player as wide receiver.

MLL career
McGlone was selected 5th overall in the 2006 Major League Lacrosse Collegiate Draft by the Baltimore Bayhawks.
He played ten games for the Bayhawks in the 2006 Season.

During the 2008 MLL season, McGlone was traded to the San Francisco Dragons.

NLL career
McGlone was drafted with the 3rd pick of the 4th round on the 2006 NLL Entry Draft by the Chicago Shamrox.  He was awarded Rookie of the Week honours in week 2 of the 2007 season for leading the Shamrox to their first franchise victory. After the season, McGlone was named to the All-Rookie team.

On March 24, 2007, McGlone (who attended Ridley High School) played in front of his hometown crowd versus the Philadelphia Wings.  In honor of high school teammate, Nick Colleluori, who died from non-Hodgkin's Lymphoma in November 2006, McGlone donated his game salary to the HEADstrong Foundation for Cancer Research.  Colleluori, who attended Hofstra University, was also honored by Blake Miller of the New York Titans earlier in the season.  McGlone scored three goals and recorded one assist in the contest.

Shortly before the 2009 season began, the Shamrox suspended operations, and a dispersal draft was held. McGlone was selected third overall by the Toronto Rock. After one season with the Rock, McGlone was traded to the Philadelphia Wings along with Kevin Huntley for Peter Jacobs.

Statistics

University of Maryland

__

NLL
Reference:

MLL

Accomplishments
2006 NCAA Division I First Team All-American
2005 NCAA Division I First Team All-American

See also
Lacrosse in Pennsylvania

References

1984 births
Living people
American lacrosse players
Chicago Shamrox players
Major League Lacrosse players
Maryland Terrapins men's lacrosse players
People from Delaware County, Pennsylvania
People from Ridley Township, Pennsylvania
Philadelphia Wings players
Sportspeople from Pennsylvania
Toronto Rock players
Ridley High School alumni